The 2020 Tour Cycliste Féminin International de l'Ardèche is a women's cycle stage race held in France from 3 September to 9 September, 2020. The tour has an UCI rating of 2.1.

Stages

Classification leadership

References

International cycle races hosted by France
2020 in women's road cycling
2020 in French sport